This is a list of law enforcement agencies in Hawaii.

According to the US Bureau of Justice Statistics' 2008 Census of State and Local Law Enforcement Agencies, the state had 7 law enforcement agencies employing 3,234 sworn police officers, about 251 for each 100,000 residents.

State agencies 
 Hawaii Division of Conservation and Resource Enforcement                                              
 Hawaii Department of Public Safety
 Corrections Division
 Narcotics Enforcement Division
 Sheriff Division
 Hawaii Department of Transportation
 Harbor Police
 Airport Police
 Hawaii Department of the Attorney General, Investigations Division
 Hawaii Department of Taxation, Criminal Section
Hawaii Department of Human Services, Investigations Division

County agencies 
 Hawai‘i County Police Department - Hawai‘i
 Kaua‘i County Police Department - Kaua‘i, Ni‘ihau
 Maui County Police Department - Maui, Moloka‘i, Lāna‘ī, Kaho‘olawe

Consolidated City-County Agencies 
 Honolulu Police Department

Prosecutor Offices 

 Hawaii Prosecuting Attorney Office, Criminal Investigations Unit
Kauai Prosecuting Attorney Office, Criminal Investigations Unit
Maui Prosecuting Attorney Office, Investigative Services Division
City and County of Honolulu Prosecuting Attorney Office, Criminal Investigations Unit

References

Hawaii
Law enforcement agencies of Hawaii
Law enforcement agencies